Shaun Richardson (born May 21, 1985) is a professional Arena football linebacker for the Kansas City Command of the Arena Football League. He was signed by the San Francisco 49ers as an undrafted free agent in 2008. He played college football for the Tennessee State Tigers. He played three games for the Edmonton Eskimos in 2009.

References

External links

1985 births
Living people
American players of Canadian football
Canadian football linebackers
American football linebackers
Edmonton Elks players
Players of American football from St. Louis
Players of Canadian football from St. Louis
San Francisco 49ers players
Tennessee State Tigers football players
Kansas City Command players